Jaime Martijn Bruinier (born 28 June 1987) is a Dutch former professional footballer who played as a midfielder. He formerly played for Vitesse, AGOVV and Sparta Rotterdam.

Club career
Bruinier made his debut in professional football as a member of the Vitesse squad in the 2006–07 season. On 3 March 2007, he came on the pitch for the first time as a substitute for the injured Onur Kaya in a 2–3 home loss to Excelsior. For the 2008–09 season, Bruinier was sent on loan to AGOVV. After the season, his contract with Vitesse expired and AGOVV signed Bruinier on a permanent two-year contract.

In 2011, he joined Sparta Rotterdam from AGOVV on a three-year contract.

In 2014–15 season, Bruinier signed with Abano, in the Italian fourth-tier Serie D. In summer 2015, he returned to the Netherlands to play for amateur side VVOG. He retired from football in 2020.

International career
Bruiner has gained three caps for the Netherlands national under-16 team, making his debut against England U16 on 15 November 2002.

Managerial career
After retiring as a player of VVOG, Bruinier joined the coaching staff of the club. He was appointed the assistant of the first team on 6 April 2020.

References

1987 births
Living people
Sportspeople from Apeldoorn
Association football midfielders
Dutch footballers
SBV Vitesse players
AGOVV Apeldoorn players
Sparta Rotterdam players
Eredivisie players
Eerste Divisie players
Serie D players
Dutch expatriate footballers
Expatriate footballers in Italy
Dutch expatriate sportspeople in Italy
VVOG players
Netherlands youth international footballers
Derde Divisie players
Footballers from Gelderland
Dutch football managers